Huda is a gender neutral name, pronounced:  (sometimes spelled as Hoda or Houda) which means "right guidance". This page indexes people who use the name as their surname.

It may refer to:

Females with the surname 

Foujia Huda (born 1985), Bangladeshi sprinter
Sigma Huda, Bangladeshi lawyer
Velia Abdel-Huda (1916 – 2012), Egyptian historian

Males with the surname 

A. T. M. Shamsul Huda, Bangladeshi commissioner
Ashraful Huda, Bangladesh police officer
Choirul Huda (1979 – 2017), Indonesian footballer
Khoirul Huda (born 1989), Indonesian footballer 
KM Nurul Huda (born 1948), Bangladeshi  commissioner
Menhaj Huda (born 1967), British director and producer
Mirza Nurul Huda (1919 - 1991), Bangladeshi politician
Mohammad Bazlul Huda, Bangladeshi Army officer
Mohammad Nurul Huda (born 1949), Bangladeshi poet and novelist
Muhammad Nurul Huda, Bangladeshi police officer
Nazmul Huda, Bangladeshi politician
Norbert Huda (born 1950), German diver
Nurul Huda (CPI(M) politician) (born 1930), Indian politician
Qamar-ul Huda, Pakistani-American religious scholar
Suleman Huda, (born 1975), Pakistani cricketer

Syed Shamsul Huda (1862–1922), Indian politician
Tawfik Abu al-Huda (1894 – 1956), Jordanian Prime minister

See also 

Hoda (surname)
Houda (surname)